Lothar Ulsaß (9 September 1940 – 18 June 1999) was a German professional footballer who played as a midfielder or striker.

Club career
Early in his career Ulsaß was a prolific goalscorer at Arminia Hannover in the second tier Amateuroberliga Niedersachsen and later the first tier Oberliga Nord. Eventually Bundesliga side Eintracht Braunschweig took note of Ulsaß, who had already represented the West Germany under-23 and amateur national teams and was considered a major talent by the German press. He was signed by Braunschweig in 1964 and went on to spend nine seasons in the Bundesliga with the club. Serving as Eintracht's playmaker, Ulsaß was one of the key players in the team's 1966–67 championship-winning season.

Ulsaß was among the players involved in the 1971 Bundesliga scandal. A number of Eintracht Braunschweig players had accepted bonus payments from a third party for a win in their league game against Rot-Weiß Oberhausen, which was illegal (the game eventually ended 1–1). Ulsaß received a two-year ban and a fine, but was later allowed to transfer out of Germany. He joined Wiener Sport-Club in Austria, where he played for four more years until he retired in 1976.

International career
Ulsaß represented the Germany national team ten times, including a 1966 FIFA World Cup qualifier against Cyprus, UEFA Euro 1968 qualifier against Albania, 1970 FIFA World Cup qualifier against Austria and seven friendlies (he scored a hat-trick in 1965 against Austria).

Personal life
Ulsaß died on 18 June 1999 in Vienna from a stroke at the age of 58.

Career statistics

International goals
Scores and results list Germany's goal tally first, score column indicates score after each Ulsaß goal. Germany's goal tally first:''

Honours
 Bundesliga: 1967

References

External links
 
 
 

1940 births
1999 deaths
Footballers from Hanover
German footballers
Association football midfielders
Association football forwards
Germany international footballers
Germany B international footballers
Germany under-21 international footballers
SV Arminia Hannover players
Eintracht Braunschweig players
Wiener Sport-Club players
Bundesliga players
Austrian Football Bundesliga players
West German expatriate footballers
West German expatriate sportspeople in Austria
Expatriate footballers in Austria
West German footballers